Errors in Calculating Odds, Errors in Calculating Value is the fourth album release by indie rock outfit Shorthand Phonetics. It is a concept album which represents the first draft of fictional character Hanabishi Hideaki's debut novel entitled "Errors in Calculating Odds, Errors in Calculating Value"

Content summary
"Errors" is an eighty minute concept album that is an aural representation of the first draft of Hanabishi Hideaki's debut novel, "Errors in Calculating Odds, Errors in Calculating Value". The novel is a recounting of the events of Hide's third year in Eiroku Medical School located in Jikyoku-to, Japan.

The thing about this first draft is that the names used in this first draft still retain its original inspiration. Hide is Hide, Tsubasa is Tsubasa, Miyuki is Miyuki and so on and so forth. Each song represents a chapter in the final draft of the novel, and it is supported by an excerpt from the final draft of the novel. It is hard to explain with words, so it is imparitive that the album is listened to while reading the booklet provided. (Ababil Ashari)

- from the release notes given with the recording on the Yes No Wave Music page for the album

Track listing

References

2009 albums